Samandaridine is an extremely toxic alkaloid produced by the skin glands of various salamanders.

See also 
 Samandarin

References

External links 
 Dorlands Medical Dictionary

Alkaloids
Lactones
Oxygen heterocycles
Heterocyclic compounds with 5 rings
Vertebrate toxins
Salamanders